Liu yue xin niang (aka June Bride) is a 1960 Hong Kong musical romantic comedy film written by Eileen Chang and directed by Tang Huang.

Plot 
Grace Chang stars as Wang Tanlin, a young woman who has some doubts about her would-be fiancé. She sets sail on an ocean liner to iron things out and see once and for all whether he can be trusted.

Cast 

 Grace Chang as Wang Danlin
 Yang Chang as Dong Jifang
 Roy Chiao as Mai Qin
 Hao Ding as Bai Jin
 Enjia Liu as Mr. Wang

References 

Hong Kong musical films
1960 musical comedy films
1960 films